"The Chief Designer" is a science fiction novella by American writer Andy Duncan, originally published in the June 2001 issue of the Isaac Asimov's Science Fiction Magazine.  It won the 2002 Sturgeon Award and was nominated for the 2002 Hugo Award for Best Novella.  It also appeared in Gardner Dozois' The Year's Best Science Fiction: Nineteenth Annual Collection.

Plot summary
The story follows Sergey Korolyov, an educated man who served as a slave laborer in Siberia but eventually ends up leading the Soviet Union's space program in Baikonur, Kazakhstan. Throughout his many years of service he becomes a very well respected hero in the USSR's space program. Along the way he implements several crucial designs, helps save the lives of many cosmonauts and struggles with constant political power plays.

References

External links 
 

2001 American novels
American science fiction novels
American novellas
Works originally published in Asimov's Science Fiction
Novels set in Russia
Theodore Sturgeon Award-winning works